West Burton is a small hamlet in the Parish of Bury and the Chichester district of West Sussex, England. It lies between Bignor and Bury on the Lower Greensand ridge, 4.5 miles (7.2 km) southwest of Pulborough. It is one of a string of Saxon settlements at the foot of the South Downs escarpment where springs from the chalk strata provided clean reliable water supply.

References

External links

Villages in West Sussex